RMS Segwun  is the oldest operating steam driven vessel in North America, built in 1887 as Nipissing to cruise the Muskoka Lakes in the Muskoka, Ontario, Canada, a resort area with many lakes and rivers.  Early in the 20th century, Muskoka was poorly served by roads.  Vacationers were transported to lodges, or private cottages, via a fleet of steamships. Segwun is the oldest of only three ships in the world still carrying the status of Royal Mail Ship, and the only steamer.

Ports of call included Gravenhurst, Bracebridge, Beaumaris, Port Sandfield, Port Carling and Bala.

History

Construction

In the 1920s the Muskoka Lakes saw strong growth in tourism as the Canadian economy recovered from the trauma of World War I. By 1924 the Muskoka Lakes Navigation Company found that the six steamers then serving the lakes were growing inadequate to the task and looked to add to their fleet. Rather than commission an entirely new boat, management decided to convert the decommissioned SS Nipissing from a  paddle-wheeler to a twin propeller passenger steamer. Nipissings wrought iron hull was built on the Clyde in 1887 and was in service on the lakes from 1887 through 1915. When Segwun was rebuilt on the hull of the second SS Nipissing she was also converted from a side paddle wheel steamer with a walking beam engine into the current two counter-rotating propellers.

The conversion was performed at the Navigation Company's yard in Gravenhurst, Ontario during the fall and winter of 1924–5, at which time the bulk of Nipissings machinery was removed, including her engines. Workers installed a new Scotch marine boiler along with two secondhand Doty compound steam engines and stack. The bulk of the two lower decks were retained.

A carving of the Phoenix carried atop of Segwuns pilothouse is a replica of the one originally carried on Segwun in 1925. The first Phoenix statue was carved for a second version of SS Nipissing launched in 1887 to replace the original Nipissing destroyed in a fire the previous year.  The new version of the Nipissing inherited the engines from the original Nipissing – which had to be raised from the bottom of the lake after the fire, so the second version carried on both the name and steam engine.  At the close of the navigation season in 1925,  caught fire while being laid up, so in subsequent years the Phoenix was placed on "the Sag" where it was lost by fire a second time in 1969. SS Sagamo was not rebuilt; however the Phoenix did rise from its ashes and is now carried by the ship for which it was intended.

The ship was launched in June, 1925 for the summer passenger season. While originally she was intended to retain the Nipissing name, the extent of the alterations were so extensive that the Navigation Company chose to rename her Segwun, an Ojibwa word meaning "springtime".

Remodel
The Navigation Company underwent a change in ownership at the end of World War II, when Major Hugh C. MacLean, publisher, sold his 90% interest in the company to a Toronto businessman, Gordon Douglas Fairley. MacLean had owned his share in the company for several decades and the steamship line benefited from promotion in MacLean's publications. Perhaps anticipating another postwar economic boom similar to the 1920s Fairley made some significant investments in the company's fleet.

In the off season of 1946–7 Segwun was remodeled. The gentleman's lounge and two staterooms toward the aft of the upper deck were removed and a new series of seven carpeted staterooms were added in their place and connected to the forward oak-paneled lounge. The open space formerly present on that deck just aft of the stack was closed in. Additionally a new steel bulkhead salvaged from 
Medora was installed in the forward hold to create a crew sleeping area. The changes were generally favorable, but at the cost of increasing the craft's sensitivity to the wind. These changes finalized the silhouette of the ship to this day.

Refit
Inadequate fire alarms and firefighting equipment allowed the fire to rage out of control resulting in between 118 and 139 deaths. In the aftermath, the Ministry of Transport imposed new fire control requirements on steamships. The Muskoka Lakes Lines, then owner of Segwun and the remaining steamships of the Muskoka Lakes Navigation and Hotel Company, already suffering from declining passenger and freight business due to new competition from the automobile and trucking lines, lacked the resources to re-fit the entire fleet. The Muskoka Lakes Lines filed bankruptcy and the ships were repossessed by the Navigation Company who chose to fit the required equipment only on the flagship Sagamo and her companion Segwun. Segwun was fitted with new hoses and hydrants and sailed the 1950 season, but her occupancy certificate was cut from 243 to only 100 by the Ministry.

Accident
In the 1958 season Segwun received a new captain to replace the aging crew who had long manned the ship. Unfortunately, on his first trip, the captain bumped the swing bridge at Port Carling, almost disabling it, then later struck the concrete dock at the Lockmaster's house, resulting in a badly dented forepeak.

Segwun Museum
Most of these vessels on the Muskoka Lakes were broken up or lost to fire, when roads were built. Segwun, and the fleet's former flagship, RMS Sagamo, the last two remaining vessels in service, were retired in 1958 and Segwun spent decades moored at the Town Dock in Gravenhurst. Sagamo, converted into a floating restaurant, was destroyed in a fire in 1969.  Segwun Steamboat Museum, moored next to Sagamo, survived the fire.

Restoration
From 1972 through 1981, Segwun was restored, and put back into service on 27 June 1981.  
Segwun still maintains its Canada Post 'R.M.S.' designation as an official Royal Mail Ship. As part of a fundraising venture, she once carried her own private label wine which was distributed throughout Ontario by the L.C.B.O.  In 2001 & 2002, Segwun was voted 'Best Large Attraction' by Attractions Canada.

Current operations
Segwun now provides short sightseeing excursions, lunch and sunset dinner cruises. She is owned and operated by a registered charity – Muskoka Steamships and Discovery Centre.

Commemorative stamp tribute
In 1987 Canada Post honoured RMS Segwun with a 36 cent commemorative stamp, one of four commemorating the 1987 centennial of Gravenhurst, Ont.  A framed enlarged copy of the stamp hangs in the lobby of the Administration Offices of the District Municipality of Muskoka.

References

External links 

 The history of Muskoka Lakes Steamships
 Muskoka Steamships and Discovery Centre

Steamships of Ontario
Passenger ships of Canada
1925 ships
Transport in the District Municipality of Muskoka
Ships built on the River Clyde